Georgi Polyakov (born 23 January 1956) is a Bulgarian sports shooter. He competed in three events at the 1988 Summer Olympics.

References

External links
 

1956 births
Living people
Bulgarian male sport shooters
Olympic shooters of Bulgaria
Shooters at the 1988 Summer Olympics
Sportspeople from Sofia
20th-century Bulgarian people